Larkin at Sixty (1982) is a collection of original essays and poems published to celebrate the sixtieth birthday of the English poet Philip Larkin.  It was edited and introduced by Anthony Thwaite and published by Larkin's publishers, Faber and Faber. A poetic dramatisation of the launch of the book was written by Russell Davies.

Contents 

Thwaite's introduction reveals that there were originally to be twenty-three contributors, but four ("An American, a Russian, a Pakistani and a woman") dropped out for various reasons.  As well as the introduction, the book contains the following:
  
 Noel Hughes (a school-friend of Larkin):  The Young Mr Larkin
 Kingsley Amis: Oxford and After
 Robert Conquest:  A Proper Sport
 Charles Monteith (of Faber and Faber):  Publishing Larkin 
 B. C. Bloomfield (Larkin's bibliographer):  Larkin the Librarian
 Douglas Dunn:  Memoirs of the Brynmor Jones Library 
 Harry Chambers (a Larkin fan):  Meeting Philip Larkin
 Andrew Motion:  On the Plain of Holderness  
 Alan Bennett:  Instead of a Present 
 Donald Mitchell:  Larkin's Music
 John Gross:  The Anthologist (on The Oxford Book of Twentieth Century English Verse) 
 George Hartley (publisher of The Less Deceived):  Nothing To Be Said  
 Clive James:  On His Wit 
 Alan Brownjohn:  Novels into Poems 
 Christopher Ricks:  Like Something Almost Being Said
 Seamus Heaney:  The Main of Light 
 Peter Porter:  Going to Parties (a poem)
 John Betjeman:  Archibald (a poem)
 Gavin Ewart: An Old Larkinian (a poem)
 Notes on contributors

References

1982 non-fiction books
1982 poetry books
Philip Larkin
Faber and Faber books
English poetry anthologies
Essay anthologies
English essays